Andrea Hlaváčková and Lucie Hradecká are the defending champions, but Hradecká decided not to participate.

Hlaváčková partnered with Lisa Raymond, but lost in the second round to Angelique Kerber and Andrea Petkovic. Hsieh Su-wei and Peng Shuai won the final over Anna-Lena Grönefeld and Květa Peschke, 2–6, 6–3, [12–10].

Seeds
The top four seeds received a bye into the second round.

Draw

Finals

Top half

Bottom half

External links
 Main draw

Western and Southern Open Doubles
Doubles women